Edward Graydon Carter, CM (born July 14, 1949) is a Canadian journalist who served as the editor of Vanity Fair from 1992 until 2017. He also co-founded, with Kurt Andersen and Tom Phillips, the satirical monthly magazine Spy in 1986. In 2019, he launched a new weekly newsletter called Air Mail, which is for "worldly cosmopolitans".

Career
After high school in Trenton, Ontario, Carter attended the University of Ottawa followed by Carleton University, but never graduated from either school. In 1973, Carter co-founded The Canadian Review, a monthly general interest magazine. By 1977, The Canadian Review had become award-winning and the third-largest circulating magazine in Canada. Despite its success, The Canadian Review was bankrupt by 1978.

In 1978, Carter moved to the United States and began working for Time as a writer-trainee, where he met Andersen. Carter spent five years writing for Time on the topics of business, law, and entertainment before moving to Life in 1983. In 1986, Carter and Andersen founded Spy, which ran for 12 years before it ultimately ceased publication in 1998. Carter was then editor at The New York Observer before being invited by Vanity Fair to take over for Tina Brown, who left for The New Yorker. He was the editor from July 1992 until late in 2017. Accolades during his tenure include his having won 14 National Magazine Awards and being named to the Magazine Editors' Hall of Fame.

Carter is the author of What We've Lost (Farrar, Straus and Giroux, September 2004), a comprehensive critical examination of the Bush administration.

Carter's Vanity Fair combined high-profile celebrity cover stories with serious journalism. His often idiosyncratic personal style was depicted in How to Lose Friends & Alienate People, a book by former Vanity Fair contributing editor Toby Young. Jeff Bridges played a character based on Carter in the 2008 film adaptation.

Carter was a producer of I'll Eat You Last, a one-woman play starring Bette Midler, about legendary Hollywood talent agent Sue Mengers. The show, directed by Tony Award-winner Joe Mantello, opened at the Booth Theatre in New York City in April 2013, and at the Geffen Playhouse in Los Angeles on December 3.

Carter has co-produced two documentaries for HBO, Public Speaking (2010), directed by Martin Scorsese, which spotlights writer Fran Lebowitz, and His Way (2011), about Hollywood producer Jerry Weintraub, which was nominated for a Primetime Emmy. He also was a producer of Chicago 10, a documentary which premiered on the opening night of the Sundance Film Festival in early 2007. He was also a producer of Surfwise, which premiered at the Toronto International Film Festival in September 2007, and Gonzo, a biographical documentary of Hunter S. Thompson directed by Alex Gibney.

Carter was an executive producer of 9/11, a film by Jules and Gedeon Naudet about the September 11 terrorist attacks, which aired on CBS. Carter received an Emmy Award for 9/11, as well as a Peabody Award. He also produced the documentary adaptation of the book The Kid Stays in the Picture, about the legendary Hollywood producer Robert Evans. It premiered at the 2002 Sundance Film Festival, screened at the 2002 Cannes Film Festival and opened in theaters in July of that year. In 2012, Carter had a minor role in Arbitrage.

In 2017, he was appointed a Member of the Order of Canada by Governor General David Johnston for "contributions to popular culture and current affairs as a skilled editor and publisher".

On September 7, 2017, Carter announced his departure from the editorship of Vanity Fair. He was on gardening leave until the end of 2017.

In 2019, Carter co-launched a weekly newsletter with Alessandra Stanley called Air Mail.

Jeffrey Epstein allegations 
In 2003, Carter assigned Vanity Fair journalist Vicky Ward to write a profile of financier Jeffrey Epstein. During the course of her reporting, Ward became aware of sex abuse and trafficking allegations against Epstein, later stating that almost all of her sources mentioned "the girls, as an aside". In her 2015 article for The Daily Beast, "I Tried to Warn You About Sleazy Billionaire Jeffrey Epstein in 2003", written following Epstein's conviction in Florida, Ward revealed that she had interviewed the family of two young sisters (later identified as Annie and Maria Farmer) and discovered credible reports of molestation against Epstein, but according to Ward, the allegations were removed from the piece by then-editor Carter:"It came down to my sources' word against Epstein's... and at the time Graydon believed Epstein. In my notebook I have him saying, 'I believe him... I'm Canadian.'"

Personal life

Carter was born in Toronto. He has been married three times. His first wife was a Canadian; the marriage was dissolved before Carter moved to the United States at the age of 28. His second marriage to Cynthia Williamson lasted 18 years and they had four children. The couple divorced in 2000. Carter married Anna Scott in 2005. They have a daughter.

Former President of the United States Donald Trump has criticized him on Twitter, attacking his restaurant and tenure at Vanity Fair.

Carter splits his time between Greenwich Village and Roxbury, Connecticut. He is a co-owner of The Waverly Inn at 16 Bank Street in the West Village.

In 2009 Carter and Jeff Klein became partners in the Monkey Bar, a New York City bar and restaurant eatery with a history dating to 1936. Both men sold their interest in the property in 2020.

Bibliography 
 "Vanity Fair's" Hollywood (2000),  (editor)
 What We've Lost (2004), 
 Tom Ford: Ten Years (2004),  (with Tom Ford, Anna Wintour and Bridget Foley)
 Oscar Night: 75 Years of Hollywood Parties (2004),  (editor)
 Spy: The Funny Years (2006),  (co-author, editor)

Notes

External links
 
 

American libertarians
Canadian libertarians
Living people
Canadian magazine editors
Canadian magazine founders
Writers from Ottawa
Time (magazine) people
Vanity Fair (magazine) editors
University of Ottawa alumni
Carleton University alumni
Writers from Toronto
Canadian emigrants to the United States
Canadian expatriate journalists in the United States
Canadian political writers
American political writers
Members of the Order of Canada
People from Greenwich Village
People from Roxbury, Connecticut
1949 births